Corporal Joseph Vittori (August 1, 1929 – September 16, 1951) was a 22-year-old United States Marine who was killed in action during the Korean War.

After serving three years in the Marine Corps he returned home, joined the Marine Corps Reserve and worked various jobs around his home town.  His unit was called to active duty to participate in the Korean War and after attending some training they were sent to South Korea.

He was killed during the Battle of the Punchbowl while defending against an assault on Hill 749 near Songnea-dong on the night of September 15–16, 1951. He was fatally wounded while fighting off an enemy breakthrough at a gap in his battalion's lines. He was the 19th Marine to earn the nation's highest decoration for heroism in Korea. For his actions he posthumously received the Medal of Honor.

Early life
Vittori was born in Beverly, Massachusetts August 1, 1929 and attended school there until graduating from high school. He worked on his father's farm until October 4, 1946, and then joined the Marine Corps on a three-year enlistment.

Military career
After enlisting he was sent to the Marine Corps Recruit Depot Parris Island in South Carolina where he graduated in December 1946. After sea duty he was then stationed at the Philadelphia Navy Yard until May 1948, when he joined the 2nd Marine Division at Camp Lejeune North Carolina. From January to May 1949, he served with the Sixth Fleet in the Mediterranean area and again served at Camp Lejeune, until October 3, 1949, when he was discharged.

With his service to the Marine Corps over he returned to his hometown of Beverly, Massachusetts and worked for a year as a plasterer and bricklayer until enlisting in the Marine Corps Reserve on September 26, 1950, for an indefinite tour of active duty. He was sent back to Camp Lejeune for training until January 1951, when he arrived in South Korea to join Company F, Second Battalion, First Marines, First Marine Division (Reinforced). He participated in the South and Central Korean campaign, receiving a promotion to corporal on June 15, 1951. On June 9, 1951, he earned his first Purple Heart when was wounded near Yanggu, and after leaving the field hospital, was assigned a position as a property sergeant. After a week at the new job, he asked to rejoin his buddies in his old infantry platoon, and was allowed to do so.

On September 16, 1951, during the Battle of the Punchbowl his company was assaulting Hill 749, where the Korean People's Army had established several entrenched positions. A vicious enemy counter-attack drove back a forward platoon with heavy casualties, and along with two other volunteers from his reserve platoon, he dashed into hand-to-hand combat in the midst of the swarming enemy to give the Marine company time to consolidate its positions. Later, when a call went up for an automatic rifleman to defend an isolated heavy machine gun position on the flank of his company's sector, he again volunteered. With heavy casualties leaving a  gap in the Marine lines at the position, he fought a single-handed battle to prevent an enemy breakthrough. Leaping from one side of the position to the other, he kept up a withering fire of over 1,000 rounds in three hours. He made repeated trips through heavy shellfire to replenish his ammunition, manned a machine gun after its gunner fell, and despite enemy penetration to within feet of his position, kept the enemy out of the breach in his company's lines until he was killed by a single gunshot wound in the face. The next morning the Marines counted almost 200 enemy dead in the area.

He was originally buried at the United Nations military cemetery in Busan, South Korea. His body was returned to the United States in January 1952 for reburial in St. Mary's Cemetery, Beverly, Massachusetts. The Medal of Honor was presented to his parents on September 7, 1952.

Awards and decorations
In addition to the Medal of Honor, he received two Purple Hearts for wounds received in action and the following medals.

Medal of Honor citation
The President of the United States in the name of The Congress takes pride in presenting the MEDAL OF HONOR posthumously to

for service as set forth in the following CITATION:
For conspicuous gallantry and intrepidity at the risk of his life above and beyond the call of duty while serving as an Automatic Rifleman in Company F, Second Battalion, First Marines, First Marine Division (Reinforced), in actions against enemy aggressor forces in Korea on 15 and 16 September 1951. With a forward platoon suffering heavy casualties and forced to withdraw under a vicious enemy counterattack as his company assaulted strong hostile forces entrenched on Hill 749, Corporal Vittori boldly rushed through the withdrawing troops with two other volunteers from his reserve platoon and plunged directly into the midst of the enemy. Overwhelming them in a fierce hand-to-hand struggle, he enabled his company to consolidate its positions to meet further imminent on slaughts. Quick to respond to an urgent call for a rifleman to defend a heavy machine gun positioned on the extreme point of the northern flank and virtually isolated from the remainder of the unit when the enemy again struck in force during the night, he assumed position under the devastating barrage and, fighting a singlehanded battle, leaped from one flank to the other, covering each foxhole in turn as casualties continued to mount, manning a machine gun when the gunner was struck down and making repeated trips through the heaviest shellfire to replenish ammunition. Mortally wounded by enemy machine-gun and rifle bullets while persisting in his magnificent defense of the sector where approximately 200 enemy dead were found the following morning, Corporal Vittori, by his fortitude, stouthearted courage and great personal valor, had kept the point position intact despite the tremendous odds and undoubtedly prevented the entire battalion position from collapsing. His extraordinary heroism throughout the furious night-long battle reflects the highest credit upon himself and the United States Naval Service. He gallantly gave his life for his country.
/S/ HARRY S. TRUMAN

See also

Medal of Honor, Vittori is featured in Season 1, Episode 6
List of Korean War Medal of Honor recipients

Notes

References

Further reading

1929 births
1951 deaths
American military personnel killed in the Korean War
American people of Italian descent
Korean War recipients of the Medal of Honor
People from Beverly, Massachusetts
United States Marine Corps Medal of Honor recipients
United States Marine Corps personnel of the Korean War
United States Marine Corps reservists
United States Marines